The Institute of Civil Engineering (India) may refer to:

 Institute of Civil Engineering of the University of the Philippines Diliman.
 Indian Railways Institute of Civil Engineering of Indian Railways.
 Hebei Institute of Architecture and Civil Engineering, a private university in Hebei, China.

As an organization, it may also refer to:
 Institution of Civil Engineers.